Graham Walker Cook (16 September 1893 – 11 July 1916) was a New Zealander who was killed in World War I

Early life 
Cook was born in Russell in 1893 and was the eldest son of Captain T. W. Cook. The family moved to Auckland and he was educated at Ponsonby District School. He did well at school and won a place in the "High School at Wellington" where he studied for two years. His family again returned to Auckland when he was 16 and he finished his education at Auckland Grammar School. He joined the Auckland Gas Company where he was working at the time of his enlistment in the army.

Playing career 
He played as a junior for the Ponsonby United and debuted for their senior team in 1915.

Death
Cook enlisted in the army during World War I and embarked on the Aparima on February 29, 1916. He was killed in France on July 11, 1916.

References

External links

Search for "Cook" at rugbyleagueproject.org

1893 births
1916 deaths
New Zealand military personnel killed in World War I
New Zealand national rugby league team players
New Zealand rugby league players
Place of birth missing
Rugby league wingers
Auckland rugby league team players
Ponsonby Ponies players
Wellington rugby league team players